Jack Brown Lowry (25 November 1916 – 5 February 2007) was an Australian rules footballer who played with St Kilda in the Victorian Football League (VFL).

Before he made his VFL debut, Lowly represented Victoria in a first-class cricket fixture against Tasmania at the Melbourne Cricket Ground. He scored 62 in his first innings and was run-out for just three in his next.

A Melbourne High School student, he started his football career at Prahran, where he was a premiership player and won a VFA Medal in 1937. On the back of this effort Lowry was signed by St Kilda and he made his debut in the opening game of the 1938 season. He spent nine years playing at St Kilda but suffered from constant injuries, restricting him to just 53 senior appearances.

Lowry died in February 2007 at the age of 90.

See also
 List of Victoria first-class cricketers

References

External links

Cricinfo: Jack Lowry

1916 births
2007 deaths
Australian rules footballers from New South Wales
Australian rules footballers from Victoria (Australia)
St Kilda Football Club players
Prahran Football Club players
Australian cricketers
Victoria cricketers
People from Newcastle, New South Wales
Cricketers from New South Wales